The 1982 British Formula One Championship was the fourth and final season of the British Formula One Championship. It commenced on 9 April 1982 and ended on 30 August after five races.

Championship
After the Aurora company withdrew as the series' main sponsor in 1980, no championship was held in 1981. The series was revived in 1982 but with only a five round championship the series was only a shadow of its former self. Only ten drivers competed in the championship. The Drivers' Championship was dominated by Jim Crawford who claimed the championship in round four at Donington Park.

The opening round of the 1983 season was held at Oulton Park. The race won by Mike Wilds was the last British F1 Championship race as the undersubscribed series was disbanded after that event.

Teams and drivers

Results and standings

Races

Drivers' standings
Points are awarded to the top ten classified finishers using the following structure:

References

British Formula One Championship
Formula One